Ravensworth is a census-designated place in Fairfax County, Virginia, United States. Its name reflects Ravensworth plantation, farmed since the 18th century and manor house which burned under mysterious circumstances on August 1, 1926. The Ravensworth Farm subdivision was developed in the early 1960s. The 2010 census lists the area's population as 2,466. It is part of the Washington metropolitan area.

Geography
Ravensworth is in eastern Fairfax County, bordered by the Capital Beltway to the northeast, Braddock Road to the north, Accotink Creek to the west, Lake Accotink to the south, and Flag Run to the southeast. Neighboring communities are Wakefield to the north, North Springfield to the east, and Kings Park to the south and west. The CDP border follows Accotink Creek to the west, Braddock Road to the north, Interstate 495 to the east, and Flag Run to the southeast.

The Ravensworth Farm community has a neighborhood pool and a civic association, and is home to the notorious Golden Ravens. The Ravensworth Shopping Center has stores including 7-Eleven, The Swiss Bakery, Lotte Plaza Market (which replaced Safeway), and Jersey Mike's Subs.  Ravensworth Elementary School is located in the middle of the neighborhood.  It has a 7/10 rating on Great Schools.

Economy
The corporate headquarters of Ensco is physically located in Ravensworth CDP, with a Springfield postal address.

Education
Fairfax County Public Schools operates Ravensworth Elementary School in the CDP.

References

Census-designated places in Fairfax County, Virginia
Washington metropolitan area
Census-designated places in Virginia